The Volunteer Force Training School Diyatalawa (VFTS Diyatalawa) is the primary training facility for the Sri Lanka Army Volunteer Force. Traditionally, training of the Ceylon Defence Force took place at Diyatalawa Garrison with the annual training camp becoming a regular fixture. This practice continued after the formation of the Ceylon Army in 1949, with the CDF camp been renamed as the Volunteer Force Training Centre and tasked with the training of personal of the Ceylon Volunteer Force and Ceylon Cadet Corps. In 1988, with the re-designation of the National Cadet Corps, the Volunteer Force Training Centre was restructured Volunteer Force Training School with its own Commandant.

Courses

Officer courses
Commissioning courses
Direct enlisted officers' course (Direct Entry Stream to the Volunteer Force for professionals such as Doctors, IT specialists, Civil Engineers, Accountants etc.)
National Cadet Corps officers' course (Probationary officers for the National Cadet Corps)
Retired warrant officers commissioning course  
Other ranks commissioning course
Quartermaster Commission Courses (carried out in conjunction with Army School of Logistics)
Senior officers course (volunteer)
Second in command course 
Junior staff officer course 
Junior command course 
Functional English course

Other ranks courses
Promotion course for corporal to sergeant
Leadership development course for senior NCOs
Junior instructor course
Junior leadership development course

Notable alumni
 Karu Jayasuriya - Former Speaker of Parliament and Minister
 Nissanka Wijeyeratne — Former Minister
 Ravi Jayewardene - Former National Security Adviser

See also
Sri Lanka Military Academy
Mons Officer Cadet School

References

External links 
Volunteer Force Training School Diyatalawa

Training establishments of the Sri Lanka Army
1988 establishments in Sri Lanka
Military academies of Sri Lanka
Staff colleges in Sri Lanka
Business schools in Sri Lanka
Educational institutions established in 1988 
Education in Uva Province
Sri Lanka Army Volunteer Force